Sutton, Illinois may refer to:
Bentley, Illinois, formerly known as Sutton
Sutton, Cook County, Illinois, an unincorporated community in Cook County